Zane's Sex Chronicles is an American television series based on the urban erotica novels written by Zane. The series follows the friendships and relationship of five female friends who enjoy the steamy stories of erotic writer Zane. The series aired on Cinemax from October 11, 2008 to May 28, 2010.

Premise
The series follows heroine Patience James and her girlfriends, Eboni, Maricruz, Lyric, and Ana Marie as they take on their lives in the big city, look for love and empower themselves—both in and out of the bedroom.

Cast and characters

Main characters
 Patrice Fisher as Patience James, a V.P. of Marketing for Flava Cosmetics. She also lives an anonymous double life as writer Zane, a secret she keeps from her friends. Confident and strong-willed, Patience begins a relationship with Hunter.
 Maya Gilbert as Dr. Lyric Stansfield-Cruz, an obstetrician. Lyric is happily married to Dr. Estaban Cruz but sexually frustrated within their relationship.
 Johanna Quintero as Maricruz Aguilar, a designer for Flava Cosmetics and colleague of Patience James. Maricruz is married and a mother of two children. She divorces her husband in season two but can not seem to break away from him.
 Laila Odom as Ana Marie Hawkings, a comedian and Patience James's best friend since high school. Ana Marie is involved in an on-again-off-again relationship with her boyfriend, Taariq.
 Christina DeRosa as Hannah "Eboni" Bendenhall (Season 1), the free-spirited owner of spa Steam.
 Amin Joseph as Taariq, the hip-hop artist boyfriend of Ana Marie.
 Megan McCord Kim as Jade (Season 2), a childhood friend of Patience's, Lyric's and Ana Marie's.
 Liana Mendoza as Trinity (Season 2), the newest vixen in town whom is having a sexual relationship with Kerrigan and co-owns the hottest new club, The After Life.

Recurring characters
 Gichi Gamba as Stephen Kerrigan
 Ezra "Buddha" Masters as Hunter
 Steve West as Grayson (Season 2).

Episodes

Season 1 (2008)

Season 2 (2010)

Cancellation
Zane posted an update on September 13, 2010 on Facebook about the future of the show:

"Many of you have asked about the return of Zane's Sex Chronicles on Cinemax for a third season and I realize that a lot of you ordered the channel just for me. Again, I appreciate you. I wanted to let you know that there will not be a third season. Also, the second season is not scheduled to be released on DVD at this time. But, you can still purchase the first season on Amazon.com or rent it from Blockbuster or NetFlix. For those of you who got really caught up in the characters, there is a tie-in book for the series that digs deeper into their backgrounds and relationships. It is entitled Zane's Sex Chronicles, exactly like the show."

References

External links
 
 Director Shawn Foster

2008 American television series debuts
2010 American television series endings
2000s American drama television series
2000s American romance television series
2010s American drama television series
2010s American romance television series
Cinemax original programming
Television series by Warner Bros. Television Studios
Erotic television series
Television shows based on American novels
English-language television shows